Mustafa Kamalak (born 1948 in Kahramanmaraş)  is a Turkish politician and was the leader of the Felicity Party from March 2011 to October 2016. He graduated from Ankara University. He is married and the father of 2 children.

References

1948 births
Living people
People from Kahramanmaraş
Felicity Party politicians
Deputies of Kahramanmaraş
Leaders of political parties in Turkey
Ankara University Faculty of Political Sciences alumni
Members of the 21st Parliament of Turkey
Members of the 20th Parliament of Turkey